The M40 recoilless rifle is a portable, crew-served 105 mm recoilless rifle made in the United States. Intended primarily as an anti-tank weapon, it could also be employed in an antipersonnel role with the use of an antipersonnel-tracer flechette round. The bore was commonly described as being 106 mm caliber but is in fact 105 mm; the 106 mm designation was intended to prevent confusion with incompatible 105 mm ammunition from the failed M27. The air-cooled, breech-loaded, single-shot rifle fired fixed ammunition and was used primarily from a wheeled ground mount. It was designed for direct firing only, and sighting equipment for this purpose was furnished with each weapon, including an affixed spotting rifle. 

A limited number of M50 Ontos were built as a self-propelled light armored tracked anti-tank vehicle. They had six 106 mm M40 recoilless rifles as its main armament, which could be fired in rapid succession against a single target to guarantee a kill.

Replacing the M27 recoilless rifle, the M40 primarily saw action during the Vietnam War and was widely used during various conflicts thereafter in Africa or in the Middle East. It was replaced by the BGM-71 TOW anti-tank missile system in the US Armed Forces.

Design history 
The earlier M27 recoilless rifle was a 105-mm weapon developed in the early 1950s and fielded in the Korean War. Although a recoilless rifle of this caliber had been a concept since the Second World War, the weapon was hurriedly produced with the onset of the Korean War. The speed with which it was developed and fielded resulted in problems with reliability caused by trunnions that were mounted too far to the rear. The M27 was also considered too heavy by the U.S. Army and had a disappointing effective range due to the lack of a spotting rifle. Taking the M27 as the basis for a new design, the Army developed an improved version of the M27 that was type-designated the M40 106-mm recoilless rifle in 1955. Although unsuitable for military purposes, M27 recoilless rifles were used to trigger controlled avalanches at ski resorts and mountain passes in the United States.

Description
The M40 is shaped like a long tube with an M8C .50 cal spotting rifle above. The spotting rifle fires a round whose trajectory closely matches that of the 105 mm round and gives off a puff of smoke on impact with the target. On the left side, there is an elevating wheel, in the center of which is the trigger wheel used to fine adjust the elevation and at the same time firing the spotting rifle when pulled, and the gun when pushed. The mounting is a tripod, but the front leg has a castering wheel. On top of the mount is a traverse wheel. On the center of the traverse wheel is a locking wheel, when the wheel is down, the rifle is locked in traverse, and can only be moved right and left with the traverse wheel. When the wheel is raised, the rifle can be traversed by hand. Austria produced a two-wheeled mount for the M40.

The whole mounting can be placed on an M151 Jeep for mobile use. It has also been mounted on M113s, UMM 4x4s, Jongas, Fath Safirs, Land Rover Defenders, Mercedes-Benz G-Wagen, Hotchkiss M201 jeeps, Toyota Land Cruisers, Jeep CJs, Willys M38s, HMMWVs, M274 Mechanical Mules, Tiuna 106mm weapons platforms, KADDB Al Jawad vehicles, RBY MK 1s, AIL Abirs and AIL Storms. They were also used on US Navy minesweepers (MSO) during Operation Market Time in Vietnam.

A special vehicle called the Ontos carried six M40s. A version specific to the T195E5 mount, the M40A1C, was used. It was used only by the U.S. Marine Corps. Japan produced a self-propelled gun called the Type 60, which carried two side by side. Some Pakistani M113s have a dual mounting. Three Panagopoulos coastal patrol boats class of the Hellenic Coast Guard and the Hellenic Navy in service of 1976-2003 was armed with two sextuples M40.

The M40 was a very successful export item and continues to be used by South Korea, Ecuador, Estonia, Greece, Honduras, Iran, Lebanon, Malaysia, Mexico, Morocco, the Philippines, Taiwan, Turkey, Colombia, Venezuela and many others, as well as anti-government forces in the Libyan Civil War and Syrian civil war.

Non-US production

Ammunition
Ammunition for the 105 mm rifle was issued as one-piece fixed cartridges. The term "fixed" means that the projectile and the cartridge case are crimped together. This ensures correct alignment of the projectile and the cartridge case. It also permits faster loading because the projectile and the cartridge case are loaded as one unit. The rear end of the cartridge case is perforated, to allow the propellant gas to escape through the vented breech, thus neutralizing recoil. Most projectiles (except HEAT) used are pre-engraved, that is, the rotating bands are cut to engage the rifled bore. If the round was not rotated slightly when loading the M40 it could result in jamming in the breech.

Types of ammunition included HEAT, High Explosive Plastic-Tracer (HEP-T), canister, High Explosive Anti Personnel, and the M368 dummy round which could not be fired and was used for crew drill. The original U.S. HEAT round penetrated more than 400 mm of armor. Near the end of the M40's service life, both Austria and Sweden produced HEAT rounds for the weapon capable of penetrating more than 700 mm of armor.

Spotting rifle
The ammunition for the M8C spotting rifle is not .50 BMG, but a 12.7x77mm (22mm shorter) round than used in .50 caliber machine guns. The spotter round was developed to replicate the trajectory of the 106 mm ammunition, and features a tracer element and a point-detonating incendiary filler to create a puff of white smoke at the impact point. Four of the six 106mm rifles on the M50 Ontos mounted spotter rifles. Spotter rounds has a yellow tip with a red band and practice cartridges had a green tip.

Although the spotting rifle could conceivably be used in an antipersonnel role, historic U.S. military doctrine strongly discouraged this use, for a purely tactical reason—to conceal the vulnerable M40 and its crew from the enemy until the main rifle was ready to fire. However, this restriction is believed to be the source of a long-standing misconception that the laws of war restrict the use of .50-caliber projectiles against enemy personnel more generally.

Civilian use
In the early 1990s, the United States Forest Service (USFS) introduced the M40 for avalanche control as ammunition stocks for its M27 rifles became depleted. The M40 was initially successful due to operational similarities to the familiar M27 and ready availability from the U.S. military; however, in 1995, a USFS gunner was killed by shrapnel after a low-level premature warhead detonation inside an M40 barrel. The accident was attributed to an undiscovered hairline crack in the projectile's base plate. Following this incident, most USFS M40s were quickly replaced with surplus 105 mm howitzers, but a few were kept in service with safety barriers to protect the gunners, who fired the guns remotely. In December 2002, two M40s at Mammoth Mountain were destroyed by catastrophic bore explosions 13 days apart. The gunners were uninjured, having been protected by the safety barriers, but the incidents prompted the USFS to retire all remaining M40s in July 2003.

Also in the mid 1990s, Parks Canada acquired four M40s for avalanche control to replace the Canadian Armed Forces using 105 mm towed howitzers in Rogers Pass (British Columbia) on the Trans-Canada Highway. Special pedestals were built at specific locations and a pneumatic remote firing system was devised to allow the operators to fire the recoilless rifle safely in case of ammunition malfunction. After a trial period, the M40s plan was abandoned and the Canadian Armed Forces once again began providing 105mm towed howitzers and artillery personnel to conduct avalanche control.

Users

 : used by mercenaries of FNLA on Land Rovers and by UNITA.
 : replaced the 6-pdr gun from 1961. Remained in service into the 1990s and in limited use in Afghanistan.
 : Locally produced as 10.6 cm rPAK M40A1
: 25 M40A1s 
 : 238 M40A1s 

 : 194 M40A1s 
 
 
: 40 M40A2s 
 
: 14 

 : 213 M40A1s 
 : Locally produced as Type 75
 : 73 M40A1s 
 

 : 144 M40A1s 
 : remained in limited service in Afghanistan.
 : 16 M40A1s 
 : 20 M40A1s 
 : 24 M40A1s 
 
 : 20 M40A1s , including some Spanish-made guns
 : 30 M40A1s 
 

: 56 M40A1s , including some Spanish-made guns
 : 581 M40A1s 
 
 : 50 M40A1s , including some Spanish-made guns
 : M40A1C locally produced. More than 3,000 in service 

 : Locally produced. ~200 M40s in service
 

 
 
: ~12 M40A1s 
 : Locally produced by Japan Steel Works as Type 60
 

 : 113 M40A1s 
  Lebanese Forces
: 6 M40s 
 
 : American, Chinese and Iranian variants
 

 : 24 M40s 
: ~90 M40A1s 
  - including some Spanish-made guns
 : 350 M40A1s 
 : more than 1,000 M40A1 RCLs in service , including Spain made CSR-106s and Pakistani-made M40A1s. used for bunker busting and anti-personnel/infantry support role in counter-insurgency campaigns.

 
 
: 8 M40s 

  - Identified as 106mm Rekylfri Kanon M40
 : Locally produced. Still in service 

 
 : 45 M40A1s 
 
 
: 90 M40A1s 
  Transferred from Yemen
 : South African National Defence Force.
 : Locally produced. Still in service in 2016.
 
 : Locally produced by Santa Bárbara Sistemas as CSR-106
 : ~30 
: 40 M40A1s . Also used some Chinese Type 75s, some being captured by the Sudan People's Liberation Army
 
 : In the period 1958–1990, the antitank companies of the Swiss Army Infantry Regiments were equipped with 12 M40 guns.
 : used by the Free Syrian Army and pro-government militias
 
 : 150 M40s 
 
 : 2,329 M40A1s 
 : 69 M40A1s 
: 12 M40s 
 : used by Airborne Forces from 1956 until the mid 1960s. Credited with the destruction of an Egyptian SU100 during the Suez Crisis
 
 : 175 M40A1s

Gallery

See also
 List of U.S. Army weapons by supply catalog designation (SNL C-93)
 M18 recoilless rifle
 M20 recoilless rifle
 Pansarvärnspjäs 1110
 Weapons of the Cambodian Civil War
 Weapons of the Salvadoran Civil War
 Weapons of the Laotian Civil War
 Weapons of the Lebanese Civil War

References

Notes

Bibliography
 (JAH) Terry Gander and Ian Hogg (ed.), Jane's Ammunition Handbook 1994, Coulsdon: Jane's Information Group Ltd., 1993.
 (JIW) Richard Jones and Leland Ness (ed.), Jane's Infantry Weapons 2007–2008, Coulsdon: Jane's Information Group Ltd., 2007.

External links

 globalsecurity.org
 M40 repair manual
 BRL report on M40 accuracy
 M40 in Canadian service

Recoilless rifles of the United States
Cold War weapons of the United States
Military equipment introduced in the 1950s